Ilse Uyttersprot (10 May 1967 – 4 August 2020) was a Belgian Christian Democrat politician who served as a CD&V member of the Chamber of Representatives for East Flanders.

Born in Dendermonde, she was the daughter of Raymond Uyttersprot, former mayor of Moorsel. She was a Chamber member from 2007 to 2010. From 2007 to 2013, she was mayor of Aalst, Belgium. Afterwards, she became a schepen (alderman) of the city.

Death
Uyttersprot was murdered with a hammer in August 2020, aged 53; her boyfriend turned himself in to the police and admitted the crime, after which her body was discovered in an apartment in Aalst. She is survived by two children.

References

1967 births
2020 deaths
Members of the Chamber of Representatives (Belgium)
Christian Democratic and Flemish politicians
People from Dendermonde
21st-century Belgian politicians
21st-century Belgian women politicians
Mayors of places in Belgium
Women mayors of places in Belgium
People murdered in Belgium
Belgian murder victims
Female murder victims